Pat Meyer (born April 5, 1972) is an American football coach, currently the offensive line coach for the Pittsburgh Steelers of the National Football League (NFL). He formerly served as the offensive line coach for the Carolina Panthers.

Playing career
After being a five-sport letterman at Girard High School in football, wrestling, basketball, baseball and track, Meyer played college football for Colorado State as an offensive lineman from 1991–1994, earning All-Western Athletic Conference honors for three consecutive years, and in his final season, Meyer played four different positions. He was later signed by the Arizona Cardinals in 1995, and played for the St. Louis Stampede of the Arena Football League the following season.

Coaching career

Early Coaching Career
In 1997, Meyer became a graduate assistant for the Memphis Tigers, and later worked in the school's strength and conditioning department, and spent five months in 2000 as the director. Meyer later joined the NC State Wolfpack as the head strength and conditioning coach, and in 2004, he was named head of the entire athletic department's strength programs, which he would hold until 2006, in which he joined Florida State as strength coach. In 2008, Meyer joined his alma mater as the offensive line coach, and became the offensive coordinator in 2011. In 2012, Meyer joined the Canadian Football League's Montreal Alouettes as the offensive coordinator/offensive line coach. During the season, the Alouettes finished third in the league in scoring with 26.6 points per game, was tied for first in touchdowns with 51 and fewest sacks allowed with 30.

Bears
On January 24, 2013, Meyer was hired by former Alouettes head coach Marc Trestman to become the Chicago Bears' assistant offensive line coach; Meyer was the third Alouettes assistant to join the Bears, following tight ends coach Andy Bischoff and assistant defensive line coach Michael Sinclair. On February 12, 2014, Meyer was promoted to offensive line coach. He was not retained by the Bears for the 2015 season.

Bills
On July 31, 2015, Meyer was hired as a Football Operations Consultant for the Buffalo Bills.

Chargers
In 2017, Meyer joined the Los Angeles Chargers as the offensive line coach and run game coordinator.

Panthers
In 2020, Meyer joined the Carolina Panthers as the offensive line coach.He was fired after the 2021 season.

Steelers
On February 15, 2022 Meyer joined the Steelers as the team’s offensive line coach.

References

External links
 Chicago Bears bio
 NC State bio

Living people
1972 births
Buffalo Bills coaches
Carolina Panthers coaches
Chicago Bears coaches
Colorado State Rams football players
Colorado State Rams football coaches
Los Angeles Chargers coaches
NC State Wolfpack football coaches
Memphis Tigers football coaches
Florida State Seminoles football coaches
Montreal Alouettes coaches
Arizona Cardinals players
St. Louis Stampede players
American football offensive linemen
Players of American football from Youngstown, Ohio
Pittsburgh Steelers coaches